Spondon Cricket Club is an amateur cricket club based in Spondon, Derbyshire, England. The club has a history dating back to the late 19th century.

Ground
The home ground is located on Locko Road in Spondon, Derbyshire and has two pitches, an all-weather pitch and a two lane, all-weather net facility. The 1st and 2nd XI teams use the pitch directly in front of the pavilion, rated by the DCCL as a Grade A+ ground, and the 3rd and 4th XI use the pitch in the field beyond the 1st pitch, rated a Grade B ground.

History
The earliest known record of Spondon Cricket Club dates back to 1883 when the local village boys were invited to join with the pupils of Spondon House School for Sons of Gentlemen. The school was housed in a Georgian mansion that was a secondary seat of the Drury Lowes, on the Locko estate. A pre match photograph survives from the period, showing the boys team on the school grounds. Both the school and the village team officially amalgamated in 1903 and set up a ground on Royal Hill Road. The club purchased the ground in 1924, and managed to pay the debt in full by 1945. The club had a 'golden age' in the 1960s with 16 trophies returning to Royal Hill Road between 1962 and 1972. The ground was further improved as a new pavilion was opened in 1970 by Brian Clough and a match between Derby County football team and Spondon CC. The club continued to thrive but eventually outgrew Royal Hill Road which was not big enough to play premier league cricket, or house the growing junior section and 3rd and 4th teams. In 2006 the Club sold the Royal Hill Road ground and moved to a ground on Locko Road. Their new Pavilion was officially opened by Councillor Roy Webb, Mayor of Derby 8 March 2006. The following year, the 1st XI won their first Premier League Championship.

The club currently has 4 senior teams competing in the Derbyshire County Cricket League, a Sunday 1st XI in the Mansfield and District Cricket League, an expanding girls' section which has developed into a Senior Women's League team, and a very successful junior training section that play competitive cricket in the Erewash Young Cricketers League.

Club Performance
The Derbyshire County Cricket League competition results showing the club's positions in the league (by Division) since 1999.

The Mansfield and District Cricket League competition results showing the club's positions in the league by Section (Division) since 2019.

The Derbyshire Cricket Board Indoor Competition results showing the club's positions in the league (by Division) since 2014.

Club Honours

Events on film
  Cricket fielding mishap goes viral: 23 April 2019
  Neil Kellogg talks about his association with Spondon Cricket Club
 CricketForce Day at Spondon Cricket Club

See also
Club cricket

References

External links
 
 The Club Play-Cricket website
 Spondon Cricket Club on YouTube
 Club photographs through the years
 A shot of the pavilion on the old SCC ground on Royal Hill Road. 2000
 Derbyshire County Cricket League Official Play-Cricket website

English club cricket teams
Cricket in Derbyshire
1883 establishments in England
Sport in Derby